Mast cell sarcoma is an extremely aggressive form of sarcoma made up of neoplastic mast cells. A sarcoma is a tumor made of cells from connective tissue. Mast cell sarcoma is an extremely rare tumor. Only three cases have been are reported so far. Prognosis is extremely poor. People with a mast cell sarcoma have no skin lesions, and pathology examination of the tumor shows it to be very malignant with an aggressive growth pattern. Mast cell sarcoma should not be confused with
extracutaneous mastocytoma, a rare benign mast cell tumor without destructive growth. In the cases observed, mast cell sarcoma terminated quickly as mast cell leukemia; one of the most aggressive human cancers.

See also
 Mastocytosis

References

External links 

Dermal and subcutaneous growths
Sarcoma